The middle rectal artery is an artery in the pelvis that supplies blood to the rectum.

Structure

The middle rectal artery usually arises from the internal iliac artery. It is distributed to the rectum above the pectinate line. It anastomoses with the inferior vesical artery, superior rectal artery, and inferior rectal artery.

In males, the middle rectal artery may give off branches to the prostate and the seminal vesicles. In females, the middle rectal artery gives off branches to the vagina.

Function 
The middle rectal artery supplies the rectum above the pectinate line.

Additional images

See also
 Superior rectal artery
 Inferior rectal artery

References

External links

 

Arteries of the abdomen
Rectum